Kit Barker (1916–1988) was a British painter.

Biography
Barker was born in London, England, to English father George Barker (1879–1965), a police constable and former Army batman, and Irish mother Marion Frances (1881–1953), née Taaffe, from Mornington, County Meath, near Drogheda, Ireland. His elder brother was the poet George Barker; they were raised at Battersea, London, and the family later lived at Upper Addison Gardens, Holland Park.

Barker served in the British Army from 1942 to 1945. In 1948 he married the writer Ilse Gross (1921–2006), who wrote under the pen name Katherine Talbot. They had one son, Thomas (born 1962). Barker lived in Cornwall from 1947 to 1948, where he and Ilse were involved with the artists' colony in St Ives.

In 1949 the Barkers travelled to the USA where Kit lectured at Skidmore College in New York. Kit later taught with Hassel Smith, Elmer Bischoff and David Park at the California School of Fine Arts in San Francisco (1951–1952). During their time in the USA, the Barkers stayed at Yaddo artists' community in Saratoga Springs, New York.

From 1953 Barker lived on Bexley hill, Sussex and travelled extensively in Europe and the US. He died in West Sussex in 1988.

Career
Barker was a self-taught artist. His influences included the surrealists – he exhibited some surrealist paintings.

His work is found in private collections in Australia, Brazil, Canada, Ireland, the United Kingdom, Mexico, Italy, South Africa, Sweden, the United States and Germany.

Public collections
Barkers works have been purchased by:
Olsen Foundation, US
Contemporary Art Society, London
Magdalen, Nuffield, New and Pembroke Colleges, Oxford
Memorial Art Gallery, Rochester NY, USA
Towner Art Gallery, Eastbourne, UK
Bradford City Art Gallery
West Riding of Yorkshire Education Committee
Nottingham Training College
Aberdeen Art Gallery
Nuffield Foundation Pictures for Hospitals Fund
Isle of Wight Health Authority Pictures for Hospitals
Arts Council of Great Britain

Major one-man exhibitions
 1950 Weyhe Gallery, New York
 1951 Palace of the Legion of Honor, San Francisco
 1951 St. Louis Artists' Guild, St Louis
 1957 Hanover Gallery, London
 1959 Waddington Galleries, London
 1960 Waddington Galleries, Montreal
 1961 Waddington Galleries, London
 1964 Waddington Galleries, London
 1965 Waddington Galleries, Montreal
 1966 Waddington Galleries, London
 1967 Waddington Galleries, Montreal
 1970 Arthur Tooth & Sons, London
 1971 Villiers Art Gallery, Sydney, Australia
 1972 Toorak Gallery, Melbourne, Australia
 1972 Arthur Tooth & Sons, London
 1978 Christ's Hospital Arts Centre, Horsham, Sussex
 1981 The New Arts Centre, London
 1988 Newburg Street Gallery, London
 2001 University College Chichester, Otter Gallery, Sussex
 2005 The Canon Gallery Petworth, Sussex

Barker had regular one man exhibitions throughout the 1960s and 1970s at: The David Paul Gallery, Chichester, Sussex;  Reid Gallery, Guildford, Surrey and Century Galleries, Henley on Thames.

Major group exhibitions
 1948 The Crypt Gallery, St Ives, Cornwall
 1948 Downings Bookshop, St Ives, Cornwall
 1948 St George's Gallery, London
 1949 Durlacher Gallery, New York, NY
 1951 Whitney Museum of Art, New York, NY
 1951 Philadelphia Art Alliance, PA
 1952 Art Institute of Chicago, IL (Drawings from 12 countries)
 1954 Institute of Contemporary Arts, London (Eight Painters)
 1957 John Moores Exhibition, Liverpool
 1959 Contemporary Art Society, London (Recent Acquisitions)
 1960 Irish Exhibition of Living Art
 1960 Birmingham City Art Gallery (Contemporary British Painters)
 1960 International Gallery, Chicago, IL
 1961 Memorial Art Gallery, Rochester, NY (Two Painters)
 1962 Festival of Arts, Battle, Sussex
 1967 Worthing Municipal Art Gallery, Sussex (Two Painters)
 1969 Camden Arts Centre, London (English Traditional Landscape)
 1973 Paintings in Hospitals, London
 1974 Festival of the City of London, London
 1976 Madden Gallery, London
 1981 New Arts Centre, London
 1985 Parkin Gallery, London (Cornwall 1925 -1975)
 1987 Questra Gallery, Kingston upon Thames, SU
 1990 Birch and Conran Gallery, London

Other reproduced works include

 Frost and Reed [Venture] prints, 'Marsh Grasses & Inner Harbour, Concarneau 1964.
 Winter At Gurnard's Head, poem poster with David Wright MidNAG 1979.
 Curlew, poem poster with Leslie Norris Armstrong poem poster 1969.
 North Haven, poem poster with Elizabeth Bishop Lord John Press 1979.

References

Further reading
 'Contemporary British Art', Herbert Read, Penguin Books, [illustrated work p42].  
 St Ives 1939-64 Twenty Five Years Of Painting, Sculpture And Pottery, Tate Gallery Publications, 1985 .
 Kit Barker, Cornwall 1947-1948 Recollections Of Painters And Writers, Katherine Talbot, The Book Gallery, 1993  (Katherine Talbot was the pen name of Barker's wife, Ilse.)

1916 births
1988 deaths
20th-century British painters
British male painters
People from Loughton
Painters from London
British Army personnel of World War II
20th-century British male artists